is a 1956 Japanese kaiju film directed by Ishirō Honda, with special effects by Eiji Tsuburaya. Produced and distributed by Toho Studios, it was Toho's first kaiju film to be shot in color, and is one of several giant monster films that found an audience outside Japan. The film stars Kenji Sahara and Yumi Shirakawa. In the United States, it was released in 1957 as Rodan! The Flying Monster!.

Plot
In the small mining village of Kitamatsu, near the foothills of Mount Aso on the southern Japanese island of Kyushu, two miners have gone missing. The two men, Goro and Yoshi, had brawled earlier that day (the film implies that the two have violently quarreled for some time) and after they entered the mine to start their shift, the shaft had flooded. Shigeru Kawamura, a tunneling and safety engineer at the mine, heads below to investigate and discovers Yoshi's lacerated corpse.

Above ground, a doctor examines Yoshi, and discovers the cause of death to be a series of deep gashes caused by an abnormally sharp object. Some of the miners and their families begin to discuss the possibility of the involvement of Goro in the death.

Two local miners and a policeman are later attacked and slain by an unseen assailant in the flooded shaft. Their bodies are recovered and examined, and the doctor announces that they were also killed by a sharp object. That night, Shigeru and his fiancée Kiyo are attacked by a Meganulon, a giant species of larval insect at Kiyo's home.

The police start hunting the creature, and it kills two officers before escaping into the mine. The police and Shigeru notice that the officers' wounds match the wounds of the murdered. Shigeru, accompanied by police and soldiers, heads into the mine, where they discover the butchered body of Goro and are chased by the insect monster. Shigeru crushes the creature with runaway mine carts, but after another insect monster appears, the tunnel caves in, trapping Shigeru in the mine.

The next day, Dr. Kashiwagi identifies the giant insect as a Meganuron, an ancient species of dragonfly larvae. An earthquake suddenly strikes the area, and rumors begin to circulate that Mount Aso might be on the verge of an eruption. When the police head to the volcano to investigate the damage caused by the earthquake, they discover that the only road to the mines has collapsed. But to their surprise, they also find an amnesiac Shigeru wandering around the epicenter.

Several miles away, in Kyushu, an air base receives an alert from a jet fighter. The pilot reports an unidentified flying object performing impossible maneuvers at supersonic speeds in the vicinity of Mount Aso. Per orders that he pursues the object but it swings around and at supersonic speed overflies the jet, destroying it and killing the pilot. After recovering remains of the jet and the pilot's helmet, the base gets word that a British airliner has been shot down by an aerial object resembling the supersonic UFO.

Soon after, more incidents are reported, from China, Okinawa, and the Philippines of aerial objects causing major destruction and the probability is established that two such objects - still foggily surmised as aircraft, visible only via contrails at ultra high altitude - are engaged in such predations.

Amid constant news reports of these mysterious attacks, a newly married couple disappears around Mount Aso, along with several cattle. When the authorities develop the film from the newlyweds' camera, they discover a photograph of what appears to be a gigantic wing. Immediately ruling out the possibility of aircraft, authorities  match the photo with a drawing of a prehistoric Pteranodon and surmise that the UFO is indeed a living being, but they want testimony from Shigeru before they can accurately account for these attacks.

Meanwhile, Shigeru's treatment is progressing slowly. One day, in Shigeru's hospital room, Kiyo shows him the eggs that her pet birds have lain. As one of the eggs hatches, Shigeru recalls that he woke up deep within the mine after the cave-in, and found himself surrounded by hordes of Meganuron. In the middle of the cave was a gigantic egg, from which Shigeru watched a massive bird creature emerge. The shock of this memory cures his amnesia.

After descending into the cave with police and scientists, Shigeru finds a fragment of the colossal egg. Dr. Kashiwagi examines the fragment in his lab and calls a meeting with townspeople and members of the Japanese Self-Defence Force. He tells the men that the object seen flying at supersonic speeds is a pterosaur he has dubbed Rodan. Kashiwagi theorizes that nuclear bomb testing may have been the cause of Rodan's awakening.

Rodan emerges from the ground near Mount Aso, takes flight, and heads for Kyushu, with a squadron of the JASDF hot on its tail. After one of its wings is injured, Rodan flies to Fukuoka, where the sonic waves and windstorms from its wings lay waste to the city. Suddenly, the JSDF reports that a second Rodan has been spotted heading towards the city. After leveling the city and leaving the remaining buildings in flames, the two Rodans fly to Mount Aso. The JSDF formulate a plan to have the military fire at the base of Mount Aso, burying the Rodans alive. Shigeru retreats with Kiyo to safety, and the military begins its attack, triggering a volcanic eruption. Mount Aso spews smoke and lava into the sky. The first Rodan's wing is damaged by the eruption; it falls towards a lava flow, where it begins to burn alive. Unwilling to live without its mate, the second Rodan dives into the eruption to join its mate in death.

Cast

 Kenji Sahara as Shigeru Kawamura, Mining Engineer
 Yumi Shirakawa as Kiyo, Goro's Sister 
 Akihiko Hirata as Kyoichiro Kashiwagi, Doctor of Paleontology 
 Akio Kobori as Nishimura, Police Detective 
 Yasuko Nakata as Honeymooning Wife
 Minosuke Yamada as Oseki, Mining Chief 
 Yoshifumi Tajima as Izeki, reporter of Seibu Nippou 
 Kiyoharu Onaka as Honeymooning Husband, Sunagawa's friend 
 Haruo Nakajima as Rodan
 Yasuhisa Tsutsumi as Imamura, F-86F Pilot 
 Ichirô Chiba as Chief of Police  
 Mike Daneen as U.S. Army Teletype Operator, Okinawa  
 Tazue Ichimanji as Haru, Kiyo's neighbor  
 Saburo Iketani as Radio News Anchor
 Saburô Kadowaki as Lab Technician, Seismic Research Institute   
 Tateo Kawasaki as Tsune, Miner  
 Kanta Kisaragi as Wasteman

Production

Writing 
Veteran writer Ken Kuronuma, who wrote the original story for this film, was inspired by an incident in Kentucky in 1948, when Captain Thomas F. Mantell, a pilot for the Kentucky Air National Guard, died in a crash while allegedly pursuing a UFO.

Filming 

While shooting the scene in which Rodan flies over the Saikai Bridge (connecting Saikai City and Sasebo City in Kyushu), the pulley from which Haruo Nakajima was suspended broke. He fell from a height of twenty-five feet, but the wings and the water, which was about one and a half feet deep, absorbed much of the impact.

English dubbing 
The main narration provided by the character Shigeru was dubbed over by actor Keye Luke, with additional voices provided by George Takei (who went on to perform similar voice work for another Kaiju film, the 1959 release Gigantis, the Fire Monster) and veteran actor Paul Frees. Voice over dubbing was done at Metro-Goldwyn-Mayer Studio in Culver City, CA. Each of the 4 voice over actors dubbed 8 or 9 different voices for the film.

Release 
Rodan was re-released theatrically in Japan on November 28, 1982, as part of Toho's 50th anniversary.

U.S. release 
 
The King Brothers Productions 1957 theatrical release of Rodan was quite successful in its first run in the United States. It was the first Japanese film to receive general release on the West Coast that made a strong showing at the box-office. It later received the largest TV advertising campaign given to a film up to that date on New York's NBC flagship station WRCA-TV, where a series of promotional commercials, running 10 to 60 seconds, were shown for a week before the film's appearance. Television promotion included a contest to copy Rodan's outline using a piece of paper held over the screen while the outline was shown on the screen for a brief time each day.

Home media 
Vestron Video released the U.S. version of Rodan on all available home media formats (VHS, Betamax, CED, and LaserDisc) simultaneously in mid-1983.

Classic Media released the U.S. version on DVD in 2002, and again in 2008 as part of a two-disc double feature with The War of the Gargantuas, this time including the Japanese version of the film (with optional English subtitles) as well.

Reception

Box office and critical response 
Rodan grossed an estimated $450,000 to $500,000 during its opening weekend at 79 theaters in the New York City metropolitan area. Several theatrical circuits, including RKO, announced that the film broke the box office records for a science-fiction film.

Writing for Turner Classic Movies, critic Richard Harland Smith described the film as "echo[ing] the somber tone of Godzilla, [but] leavening the mixture with a dash of compassion for the behemoths making hash of Japanese real estate values." In his AllMovie review, critic Craig Butler wrote that Rodan was "well worth watching" and that "[a]ficionados of this genre will find a lot to like" in the film. Author and film critic Glenn Erickson wrote that the film was "an adolescent cousin of Romeo and Juliet" and "[a]lthough far from perfect, Rodan has the innocence and wonder of early 50s Sci-Fi."

References

Citation

Bibliography

External links 

Rodan multimedia
 
 
 
 

1956 films
Kaiju films
1950s Japanese-language films
Giant monster films
Films directed by Ishirō Honda
Toho tokusatsu films
1950s fantasy films
1950s science fiction films
1956 horror films
Pterosaurs in fiction
Films about insects
Natural horror films
Films set in Fukuoka
Films set in Aso, Kumamoto
Films set in Nagasaki Prefecture
DreamWorks Classics
Films produced by Tomoyuki Tanaka
Films scored by Akira Ifukube
1950s monster movies
Films about dinosaurs
1950s Japanese films